An election to Pembrokeshire County Council was held on 4 May 2017 as part of wider local elections across Wales. The election was preceded by the 2012 election. It will be followed by the 2022 election. Twelve seats (out of the sixty available) had candidates elected unopposed.

Ward results
Nominations closed on 4 April 2017.

Amroth

Burton
Rob Summons was elected as an Independent at a by-election in 2013.

Camrose

Carew

Cilgerran

Clydau

Crymych

Dinas Cross

East Williamston

Fishguard North East

Fishguard North West
Pat Davies was elected as a Labour candidate in 2012

Goodwick

Haverfordwest: Castle

Haverfordwest Garth

Haverfordwest Portfield

Haverfordwest Prendergast

Haverfordwest Priory
The sitting member was elected as an Independent in 2012.

Hundleton

Johnston

Kilgetty / Begelly

Lampeter Velfrey

Lamphey

Letterston
Tom Richards, who had held the seat as an Independent since 1995, chose to contest as a Conservative having only narrowly defeated a Conservative in 2012.

Llangwm

Llanrhian

Maenclochog

Manorbier

Martletwy

Merlin’s Bridge

Milford Central
Stephen Joseph was elected as a Plaid Cymru candidate in 2012 but subsequently left the party.

Milford East

Milford Hakin

Milford Hubberston

Milford North

Milford West

Narberth

Narberth Rural

Newport

Neyland East

Neyland West

Pembroke Monkton

Pembroke St Mary North

Pembroke St Mary South

Pembroke St Michael

Pembroke Dock Central

Pembroke Dock Llanion

Pembroke Dock Market

Pembroke Dock Pennar

Penally

Rudbaxton
Steve Yelland was elected as an Independent in 2012, defeating the sitting Conservative candidate

St David's

St Dogmaels

St Ishmael's

Saundersfoot

Scleddau
Owen Watkin James was elected as a Conservative in 2008 and 2012.

Solva

Tenby North

Tenby South

The Havens

Wiston

References

2017 Welsh local elections
2017